
Bakala may refer to:

People 
 Břetislav Bakala - a Czech conductor, pianist, and composer.
 Zdeněk Bakala - a Czech entrepreneur, investor and philanthropist.
 Rastislav Bakala - a Slovak football midfielder.
 Ian Bakala - a Zambian footballer.

Places 
 Bakala (Central African Republic) - a sub-prefecture and town in the Ouaka Prefecture of the southern-central Central African Republic.
 Baba Bakala - a historical town and Tehsil in the Amritsar district in Punjab, India.

Others 
 Bakala Foundation - an educational group based in the Czech Republic
 Bakala (spider) - a genus of spiders
 Baba Bakala Assembly Constituency - a Punjab Legislative Assembly constituency in Amritsar district of India.

See also
 Baklava